The Greatest Love is a Philippine family melodrama television series directed by Dado C. Lumibao and Mervyn Brondial, starring Sylvia Sanchez, Nonie Buencamino, Dimples Romana, Andi Eigenmann, Arron Villaflor, Matt Evans, and Joshua Garcia. The series premiered on ABS-CBN's Kapamilya Gold afternoon block and worldwide on The Filipino Channel on September 5, 2016, to April 21, 2017, replacing Tubig at Langis. It had a total of 163 episodes and was succeeded by The Better Half from an early timeslot.

Series overview

List of episodes
Color key
  - Peak
  - Lowest Rating

Season 1

Season 2

References

Lists of Philippine drama television series episodes